The Leonese People's Union (Leonese: Unión del Pueblu Llionés, UPL) is a regional political party in Castilla y León, Spain. UPL strives to establish a separate autonomous community (Comunidad Autónoma de León or Autonomous Community of León) for the provinces of León, Zamora and Salamanca (center of the old Kingdom of León), now in the Autonomous Community of Castilla y León. Such a movement is known as Leonesism.

History
UPL was founded in 1986 by a group of people coming from different León regionalist movements and various statewide parties (Popular Alliance, Union of the Democratic Centre, Spanish Socialist Workers' Party). Initially it was known as Leonesist Union (Unión Leonesista, UNLE). It adopted its current name in 1991, when José María Rodríguez de Francisco took over the leadership of the party. In the municipality of León the party obtained three seats in the municipal council. It also won one seat in the provincial council.

In the municipal elections in 2007, UPL obtained 10.88% and three seats in the municipal council of León. In the Castile and León autonomous elections the same year, it obtained 2.69% of the votes and two seats over 83.

Its youth branch was Conceyu Xoven, an organization that promotes official status for the Leonese language and the unity and self-determination for the Leonese Country. Conceyu Xoven was expelled from the party due to its radical positions, with the Leonist Youth being designated the new youth wing of UPL.

Electoral performance

Cortes of Castile and León

See also
País Lïonés
Kingdom of León
Leonese language

References

Notes

External links
 Official website
 Municipal and regional elections

Political parties in the Province of León
Regionalist parties in Spain